Leon Kaufmann, in French, Léon Kamir Kaufmann, also known as Kamir or Kamir-Kaufman (8 June 1872, Pawłowo - 27 May 1933, Louveciennes) was a Polish painter and pastel artist who worked in France after 1902.

Biography 
In 1895, he moved to Munich, where he studied at the Academy of Fine Arts with Simon Hollósy until 1897. The following year, he entered the Académie Julian in Paris. On that occasion, his primary instructor was Jean-Joseph Benjamin-Constant. W 1900 powrócił do Warszawy. 

From 1901 to 1902, he and the literary critic  held an artistic cabaret at his studio, which was regularly attended by the author, Zofia Nałkowska and Tadeusz Ulanowski (1872-1942), a noted actor, among others. In 1902, he left for Paris and settled there permanently, but never broke off contact with his homeland, paying frequent visits to Warsaw and Vilnius, where he was the guest of the philanthropist, . In 1914, he married Odette Dessauces, from a wealthy French family. They settled on an estate in Louveciennes in 1922, but he maintained his studio in Paris.  

He also worked with the "Protection Society for Children of the Jewish Religion". In Paris, he favored the Salon d'Automne, the salon of the Société Nationale des Beaux-Arts (of which he became a member in 1911) and the Salon des Tuileries. He also held personal exhibitions and a few in other European cities, such as London, Venice and Vienna.

He painted in a variety of genres; including portraits, landscapes and interior scenes. Although he lived in France, he apparently never became involved in the various artistic schools that developed there. His pastel portraits, however, were inspired by Luminist techniques and were designed to give an impression of vagueness. Among those he portrayed were the French composers and musicians Alfred Cortot, Paul Dukas, Reynaldo Hahn and Ferruccio Busoni. His portraits of Polish notables included Wanda Landowska, Ignacy Jan Paderewski, Józef Hofmann, Stanisław Przybyszewski and Jan Rosen,

Selected works

References

External links

More works by Kaufmann @ ArtNet

1872 births
1933 deaths
Polish painters
Polish male painters
Polish portrait painters
Polish landscape painters
Pastel artists
Polish emigrants to France